The 2016–17 Handball-Bundesliga was the 52nd season of the Handball-Bundesliga, Germany's premier handball league and the 40th season consisting of only one league. It ran from 2 September 2016 to 10 June 2017.

Rhein-Neckar Löwen won their second consecutive title.

Teams 

A total of 18 teams will be participating in this year's edition of the Bundesliga. Of these, 15 sides qualified directly from the 2015–16 season and the top three sides were directly promoted from the 2. Bundesliga: HC Erlangen, the champions; GWD Minden, the runners-up; and the third-place finisher, HSC 2000 Coburg.

Standings

Results

Attendances
Teams with an average home attendance of at least 10,000:

Source:

References

External links
Official website 

Handball-Bundesliga
2016–17 domestic handball leagues
2016 in German sport
2017 in German sport